The Michigan State League was a minor league baseball league that operated in various seasons between 1889 and 1941. The league franchises were based exclusively in Michigan, with the league forming on six different occasions. Twenty two different cities hosted teams in the Michigan State league.

History
Five of the six Michigan State League incarnations operated only one or two baseball seasons and the other four seasons. Jointly they covered eleven baseball seasons from 1889 to 1941.

The first two Michigan State Leagues, 1889–1890 and 1895, predated the establishment of present-day Minor League Baseball, an umbrella organization of minor leagues. The third was a "Class D" league during 1902 only, the first season for the organized minors.

In 1911, the West Michigan League expanded and became the fourth Michigan State League as a "Class D" minor league through 1914.

In 1926, the Michigan–Ontario League merged with the Central League to form the fifth MSL, which played only the one season.

The sixth Michigan State League operated in 1940 and 1941.

Cities represented
Adrian, Michigan: Adrian Reformers 1895
Battle Creek, Michigan:  Battle Creek Adventists 1895; Battle Creek Cero Frutos  1902
Bay City, Michigan: Bay City 1897; Bay City Wolves 1926
Belding, Michigan: Belding Champs 1914
Boyne City, Michigan:  Boyne City Boosters 1911–1914
Cadillac, Michigan:  Cadillac Chiefs 1910–1914
Charlotte, Michigan: Charlotte Giants 1926
Flint, Michigan:  Flint Flyers 1889–1890; Flint 1897, 1902;  Flint Vehicles 1926; Flint Gems 1940;  Flint Arrows 1941
Grand Rapids, Michigan:  Grand Rapids 1889–1890; Grand Rapids Colts 1902; Grand Rapids Black Sox 1926; Grand Rapids Dodgers 1940; Grand Rapids Colts 1941
Greenville, Michigan:  Greenville 1889
Holland, Michigan:  Holland Wooden Shoes 1910–1911
Jackson, Michigan: Jackson Jaxons 1889, 1895; Jackson 1897, 1902
Kalamazoo, Michigan:  Kalamazoo Kazoos 1889; Kalamazoo Celery Eaters 1895;  Kalamazoo 1897; Kalamazoo Celery Pickers 1926
Lansing, Michigan:  Lansing 1889–1890; Lansing Senators 1895, 1897, 1902, 1941; Lansing Lancers 1940
Ludington, Michigan:  Ludington Mariners 1912–1914; Ludington Tars 1926
Manistee, Michigan:  Manistee 1890; Manistee Colts 1911; Manistee Champs 1912–1914
Muskegon, Michigan:  Muskegon 1890; Muskegon Speed Boys 1910; Muskegon Speeders 1912–1914; Muskegon Reds 1902, 1911, 1926, 1940–1941 
Owosso, Michigan: Owosso Colts 1895
Port Huron, Michigan: Port Huron 1890; Port Huron Marines 1895; Port Huron 1897; Port Huron Saints 1926
Saginaw, Michigan:  Saginaw 1889; Saginaw Lumbermen 1897; Saginaw Aces 1926; Saginaw Athletics 1940;  Saginaw White Sox 1902, 1941
St. Joseph, Michigan:  St. Joseph Autos 1940–1941
Traverse City, Michigan:  Traverse City Resorters 1910–1914

Standings & statistics

1889 to 1890
1889 Michigan State League
 Kalamazoo (32-42) transferred to Flint September 3. Jackson and Saginaw finished in a virtual tie for first place. Jackson played some of their make-up games to gain enough victories to win the championship. Saginaw protested. President Curtis awarded the championship banner to Saginaw. 
 
1890 Michigan State Leagueschedule
Grand Rapids left to join the International League June 12 The league disbanded June 13.

1895
1895 Michigan State Leagueschedule 
 
Owosso & Port Huron disbanded September 3.; Battle Creek (14-40) moved to Jackson August 8

1897
1897 Michigan State League
Kalamazoo (23-41) transferred to Flint July 12; Jackson disbanded July 20; Lansing disbanded July 27 The league disbanded August 16

1902
1902 Michigan State Leagueschedule
Saginaw (35-28) moved to Jackson July 20.; Grand Rapids disbanded July 20; Lansing disbanded August 20, causing the league to fold.

1911 to 1914
1911 Michigan State Leagueschedule
 
 
1912 Michigan State League
 
 
1913 Michigan State League
 
 
1914 Michigan State League
Traverse City & Boyne City both withdrew September 1; Manistee (56-51) was expelled and the franchise moved to Belding September 9.

1926
1926 Michigan State League schedule 
The league was created June 15 by the mid-season merger of the Central League and Michigan-Ontario League. Flint (18-26) moved to Charlotte July 22.

1940 to 1941

1940 Michigan State League 
 Playoffs: Saginaw 3 games, Grand Rapids 1; St. Joseph 3 games, Flint 2. Finals: Cancelled due to inclement weather. 
 
1941 Michigan State League 
 No Playoffs Scheduled.

Hall of Fame alumni

Burleigh Grimes, 1940 Grand Rapids Dodgers, MGR 
Honus Wagner, 1895 Adrian Demons

References

Sources
 The Encyclopedia of Minor League Baseball, and Third Editions.

Further reading
 Mitch Lutzke (Vol. 104, No. 5). "A One-Season Wonder: Baseball in 1889." Michigan History. Lansing, Michigan: Historical Society of Michigan (published Sept/Oct 2020). Accessed via Gale Academic OneFile at A ONE-SEASON WONDER Baseball in 1889. - Document - Michigan History Magazine .

Defunct minor baseball leagues in the United States
Baseball leagues in Michigan
Sports leagues established in 1889
Sports leagues disestablished in 1941